Leigh Rollin Whipper (October 29, 1876 – July 26, 1975) was an American actor on the stage and in motion pictures. He was the first African American to join the Actors' Equity Association, and one of the founders of the Negro Actors Guild of America. He created the role of Crooks in the original Broadway production of Of Mice and Men, which he reprised in the 1939 film version.

Biography

Whipper was the son of African-American educator, author and activist Frances Rollin Whipper and a nephew of abolitionist William Whipper, attorney William J. Whipper. Educated at Howard University Law School, he left in 1895 and never practiced as a lawyer.

Without any dramatic training, Whipper made his acting debut in a Philadelphia stock theater production of Uncle Tom's Cabin in 1899. He made his first Broadway appearance in Georgia Minstrels. His first film role was in the 1920 silent film The Symbol of the Unconquered.

A portrait of Whipper entitled "Dans un Café à Paris (Leigh Whipper)" by artist Loïs Mailou Jones, oil on canvas is currently on display at the Brooklyn Museum.  Quoted from the museum webpage: "The artist’s portrayal of a pensive Whipper answered Alain Locke’s call for black artists to create ennobling representations of African Americans."

During the Second World War, Whipper was a member of the steering committee of Negro Division the Hollywood Victory Committee.

Leigh's daughter, Leighla Frances Whipper, was a Calypso songwriter and music publisher.

Partial filmography 

 Within Our Gates (1920)
 The Symbol of the Unconquered (1920) - Tugi - an Indian Fakir
 Of Mice and Men (1939) - Crooks
 Robin Hood of the Pecos (1941) - Kezeye
 Virginia (1941) - Ezechial
 Road to Zanzibar (1941) - Scarface
 King of the Zombies (1941) - Momba
 Bahama Passage (1941) - Morales
 Lady for a Night (1942) - Joe Cupid, the Charm Seller (uncredited)
 The Vanishing Virginian (1942) - Uncle Josh
 Heart of the Golden West (1942) - Rango
 White Cargo (1942) - Jim Fish
 The Ox-Bow Incident (1943) - Sparks (uncredited)
 Mission to Moscow (1943) - Haile Selassie (uncredited)
 Happy Land (1943) - Old Ben (uncredited)
 The Impostor (1944) - Toba
 The Yellow Rose of Texas (1944) - Dock Singer (uncredited)
 Dark Waters (1944) - Minor Role (uncredited)
 Jungle Queen (1945, Serial) - Native (uncredited)
 The Hidden Eye (1945) - Alistair
 The Negro Sailor (1945)
 Young Widow (1946) - Nate (uncredited)
 Undercurrent (1946) - George
 Untamed Fury (1947) - Uncle Gabe
 Lost Boundaries (1949) - Janitor
 The Shrike (1955) - Carlisle
 The Young Don't Cry (1957) - Doosy
 Peter Gunn “Streetcar Jones”  (1958) - Lodi

References

External links
 
 

1876 births
1975 deaths
American male film actors
African-American male actors
20th-century American male actors
American male stage actors
American male television actors
Howard University School of Law alumni
20th-century African-American people